The Grand Coalition was the political alliance of Islamist groups contesting in the 1980 Iranian legislative election, led by the Islamic Republican Party. Various small fundamentalist groups joined the alliance.

Other notable groups in the alliance include Combatant Clergy Association, Mojahedin of the Islamic Revolution Organization, Islamic Coalition Societies and Islamic Association of Teachers.

The coalition won the elections, especially in the provinces and dominated the parliament.

References 

1980 establishments in Iran
Defunct political party alliances in Iran
Electoral lists for Iranian legislative election, 1980